Chilodontaidae is a taxonomic family of mostly small deepwater sea snails, marine gastropod molluscs in the clade Vetigastropoda (according to the taxonomy of the Gastropoda by Bouchet & Rocroi, 2005).

Taxonomy 
The family was previously in the superfamily Neritoidea in the order Neritopsina and the superorder Neritaemorphi.

2005 taxonomy 
This family consists of three following subfamilies (according to the taxonomy of the Gastropoda by Bouchet & Rocroi, 2005):
Chilodontainae Wenz, 1938
Calliotropinae Hickman & McLean, 1990
Cataeginae McLean & Quinn, 1987

2007 taxonomy 
A molecular phylogeny-based taxonomy of the Seguenzioidea was published by Kano (2007).

The family Chilodontidae Wenz, 1938 will be renamed because it is a homonym of the fish family Chilodontidae Eigenmann, 1912; (to be emended to Chilodontaidae by ICZN)

The subfamilies Calliotropinae Hickman & McLean, 1990 and Cataeginae McLean & Quinn, 1987 were raised to family levels as the Calliotropidae and the Cataegidae.

Genera
Genera within the family Chilodontaidae include (according to the World Register of Marine Species:
 † Agathodonta Cosman, 1918
 Ascetostoma Herbert, 2012
 † Calliovarica H. Vokes, 1939 
 Chilodonta Etallon, 1862
 Clypeostoma Herbert, 2012
 Danilia Brusina, 1865
 Dentistyla Dall, 1889
 Euchelus Philippi, 1847
 Granata Cotton, 1957
 Herpetopoma Pilsbry, 1889
 Hybochelus Pilsbry, 1889
 Mirachelus Woodring, 1928
 † Odontoturbo Loriol, 1887 
 † Onkospira Zittel, 1873 
 Perrinia H. & A. Adams, 1854
 Pholidotrope Herbert, 2012
 Tallorbis G. Nevill & H. Nevill, 1869
 Vaceuchelus Iredale, 1929

Genera brought into synonymy
 Craspedotus Philippi, 1847: synonym of Danilia Brusina, 1865
 Heliciella O.G. Costa, 1861: synonym of Danilia Brusina, 1865
 Huttonia Kirk, 1882: synonym of Herpetopoma Pilsbry, 1890
 Nevillia H. Adams, 1868: synonym of Alcyna A. Adams, 1860
 Olivia Cantraine, 1835: synonym of Danilia Brusina, 1865

References

 Poppe G.T., Tagaro S.P. & Dekker H. (2006) The Seguenziidae, Chilodontidae, Trochidae, Calliostomatidae and Solariellidae of the Philippine Islands. Visaya Supplement 2: 1-228

External links
 Photos of shells in Chilodontaidae
 WoRMS

 
Gastropod families